Inner Sanctum is the third live album and video by English duo Pet Shop Boys, released on 12 April 2019 by the duo's label x2. It was recorded in July 2018 during the band's four-day Inner Sanctum residency at the Royal Opera House in London as part of the Super Tour. The show was designed by Es Devlin and directed by David Barnard, and released on DVD, Blu-ray and CD. The DVD/Blu-ray and CD release also includes a recording of the duo playing at Rock in Rio on 17 September 2017.

Track listing

Personnel
Pet Shop Boys
Neil Tennant
Chris Lowe

Guest musicians
 Christina Hizon – keyboards, violin and vocals
 Simon Tellier – electronic drums, keyboards and vocals
 Afrika Green – electronic drums and vocals
 Pete Gleadall – musical director and programming

Charts

References

http://www.swisscharts.com/album/Pet-Shop-Boys/Inner-Sanctum-[DVD]-383627 

2019 live albums
Pet Shop Boys albums